Somnath Waghmare is an Indian documentary filmmaker based in the state of Maharashtra. His most prominent and most recent film, Battle of Bhima Koregaon, was critically received and screened in India and abroad. Till now, all his films have been documentary films and they have dealt with various social issues like the persecution of women and Dalit assertion in Maharashtra. He made his directorial debut with the short documentary feature I Am Not a Witch (2017). His upcoming films are Chaityabhoomi (which is the resting place of Dr. B. R. Ambedkar and is a symbol and place of celebration of Buddhist identity) and Gail and Bharat.

Early life and education

Somnath was born in Malewadi, a small village in Sangli district in Maharashtra. He completed his graduation in sociology from KBP college in the town of Islampur and joined Savitribai Phule Pune University in Pune for his post-graduate studies in Media and Communication Studies. After completing his post-graduate studies, Somnath worked for two years as a contract employee at the Film and Television Institute of India before joining the Tata Institute of Social Sciences in Mumbai for his M.Phil degree and then later Ph.D. in Social Sciences.

Work
Somnath has strong interests in the caste and cultural politics of Maharashtra. Both of his documentaries are focused on documentation and depiction of the political and social assertion by Dalits. He is also active in the anti-caste Phule-Ambedkarite movement of the state and has given several talks on caste in cinema, including at the Satyajit Ray Film and Television Institute in Kolkata. Waghmare's debut film I Am Not A Witch was a short documentary feature based on the persecution of marginalized women in Maharashtra. His second and most famous film Battle of Bhima Koregaon received was widely acclaimed. The film was screened at multiple locations in India and also in New York at the Dalit Film and Cultural Festival at Columbia University, New York, alongside the works of filmmakers such as Pa. Ranjith and Nagraj Manjule.

Waghmare is currently working on his third documentary film, Gail and Bharat, about Gail Omvedt and Bharat Patankar, two of the most distinguished activists and researchers of Dalit-Bahujan movements in the country. In 2020, Waghmare and Smita Rajmane received a grant Foundation for Indian Contemporary Art for their project ‘The Ambedkar Age Digital Bookmobile’.

Filmography

As director

External links 

 Battle of Bhima Koregaon on YouTube
 Gail and Bharat on YouTube

References 

Living people
Indian documentary filmmakers
People from Maharashtra
Year of birth missing (living people)